70 Big Ones is a 2018 Spanish bank heist thriller film directed by Koldo Serra which stars Emma Suárez, Nathalie Poza and Hugo Silva.

Plot 
Set in March 2015 in Bilbao, the plot concerns a bank heist, involving two robbers (the violent Lola and the heroin-addict Jonan) and Raquel, a woman who was at the bank branch desperately asking for a €35,000 credit (70 binladens; that is, 70 €500 notes) to see her daughter again when the former two break in.

Cast

Production 
The screenplay was penned by Javier Félix Echániz, Asier Guerricaechevarría and Juan Antonio Gil Bengoa. 70 Big Ones is a Sayaka Producciones, Pokeepsie Films and La Panda production, with participation of RTVE, ETB and Movistar+ and support from ICAA.

Release 
The film screened at the 51st Sitges Film Festival on 12 October 2018. Distributed by Filmax, it was theatrically released in Spain on 8 March 2019.

Reception 
Reviewing for Cinemanía, Yago García scored 3 out of 5 stars, deeming Emma Suárez and Nathalie Poza to be the best assets of the film, otherwise dragged by "screeching" plot twists, flashbacks trying to fill in the gaps, explanations coming too early or too late and, "above everything", its ending.

Alberto Bermejo of El Mundo'''s magazine Metrópoli'', rated the film with 2 out of 5 stars, praising Emma Suárez "in her most disturbing role"; the "also unrecognisable" Nathalie Poza, and Hugo Silva, while citing as a negative point "the frustrated ambition to go beyond the thriller".

See also 
 List of Spanish films of 2019

References 

2010s heist films
Spanish thriller films
Spanish heist films
2010s Spanish-language films
Films set in Spain
Films set in 2015
Films shot in Bilbao
Pokeepsie Films films
2010s Spanish films